Joanne Kurtzberg is an American professor of pediatrics and pathology at Duke University.

Education 
Kurtzberg completed her medical education at New York University in 1976.

Career 
Kurtzberg is a professor and researcher at the Duke University School of Medicine. She researches cord blood transplants in children with cerebral palsy or neonatal brain injuries.

Selected works

Journal articles 

Gluckman, E., Broxmeyer, H. E., Auerbach, A. D., Friedman, H. S., Douglas, G. W., Devergie, A., … Boyse, E. A. (1989). Hematopoietic Reconstitution in a Patient with Fanconi’s Anemia by Means of Umbilical-Cord Blood from an HLA-Identical Sibling. New England Journal of Medicine, 321(17), 1174–1178. https://doi.org/10.1056/nejm198910263211707
 Rubinstein, P., Carrier, C., Scaradavou, A., Kurtzberg, J., Adamson, J., Migliaccio, A. R., … Stevens, C. E. (1998). Outcomes among 562 Recipients of Placental-Blood Transplants from Unrelated Donors. New England Journal of Medicine, 339(22), 1565–1577. https://doi.org/10.1056/nejm199811263392201

References 

21st-century American women physicians
21st-century American physicians
20th-century American women scientists
21st-century American women scientists
20th-century American scientists
21st-century American scientists
American hematologists
American pathologists
American oncologists
Women pathologists
New York University alumni
Duke University School of Medicine faculty
Year of birth missing (living people)
Living people
Women oncologists
Women hematologists
American women academics